The Busan Yachting Center is a yachting center in Busan, South Korea. Constructed between June 1983 and May 1986 after receiving permission from the Busan Port Authority in early 1982, the venue hosted the sailing competitions for the 1988 Summer Olympics in Seoul.

References
1988 Summer Olympics official report. Volume 1. Part 1. pp. 190–1.

External links
 Information from the Korean tourism organization
 Information from the Busan Sports Facilities Management Office

Venues of the 1988 Summer Olympics
Olympic sailing venues
Sports venues in South Korea
Sports venues in Busan
Venues of the 2002 Asian Games
Venues of the 1986 Asian Games